Bartle v. Coleman, 19 U.S. (6 Wheat.) 475 (1821), was a United States Supreme Court case.

Background
Andrew Bartle, George Coleman, and Ferdinand Marsteller had entered into a contract with the United States government to rebuild a location called Fort Washington, possibly meaning Fort Washington (Maryland) which was captured by the British in the War of 1812.

Arbitrators had rules that Bartle should pay Coleman.

Opinion 
The Supreme Court reversed the judgement.

See also
 List of United States Supreme Court cases, volume 19

References

External links
 

United States Supreme Court cases
United States Supreme Court cases of the Marshall Court
1821 in United States case law